Fat Larry's Band was an American R&B and funk band from Philadelphia, which enjoyed some commercial success in the late 1970s and early 1980s, particularly in the United Kingdom.

Career
Formed by drummer and vocalist "Fat" Larry James (August 2, 1949 – December 5, 1987) in 1976, the band included trumpeter/flautist Art Capehart, guitarists Ted Cohen and Tony Middleton, vocalists Freddie Campbell (1952 – January 19, 2013) and Darryl Grant, keyboardist Terry Price, vocalist Alfonso Smith, saxophonist Doug Jones, bassist Larry La Bes, trombonist/alto saxophonist Jimmy Lee, and keyboardist Erskine Williams.

The band's biggest hits were "Act Like You Know" (which appears on the Grand Theft Auto: Vice City soundtrack) and "Zoom", which reached number 2 on the UK Singles Chart in October 1982, and number 10 on the Australian Singles Chart. Fat Larry's Band had three other hits in the UK: "Center City", "Boogie Town", and "Lookin' for Love".

On December 5, 1987, James died from a heart attack at the age of 38. As a result, the band folded.

The opening drum break from "Down on the Avenue", from the band's first album, Feel It (WMOT Records, 1976), has been sampled by many musicians, including N.W.A, Ice-T, Jungle Brothers, Depeche Mode, and Run-D.M.C.

Discography

Albums

Compilation albums
 The Best of Fat Larry's Band (1994)
 Greatest Hits (1995)

Singles

See also

List of disco artists (F-K)
Post-disco
Ultimate Breaks and Beats

References

External links
 

Musical groups from Philadelphia
Musical groups established in 1976
Musical groups disestablished in 1987
American funk musical groups
Stax Records artists